Louis Dean (3 May 1874 – 8 April 1933), was an American actor. He appeared in 16 films between 1917 and 1923.

He was born in Wilmington, Delaware, United States and died in Honolulu, Hawaii.

Partial filmography
The Darling of Paris (1917)
The Tiger Woman (1917)
My Four Years in Germany (1918)
Queen of the Sea (1918)
The Birth of a Race (1918)
The Common Cause (1919)
The Symbol of the Unconquered (1920)
 The Blood Barrier (1920)
 Man and His Woman (1920)
Cardigan (1922)
 The Woman Who Fooled Herself (1922)
 Dawn of Revenge (1922)
 Married People (1922)

External links

1874 births
1933 deaths
American male film actors
American male silent film actors
20th-century American male actors